The Aspiration Quality is an Australian Turf Club Group 3 Thoroughbred quality handicap horse race, for fillies and mares aged three-years-old and upwards, over a distance of 1600 metres at Randwick Racecourse in Sydney, Australia in March.  Total prize money for the race is A$160,000.

History
The race has been held on the Randwick Guineas race card since inception.

Grade
2006–2013 - Listed race
2014 onwards - Group 3

Venue
2006–2010 - Randwick Racecourse
 2011 - Warwick Farm Racecourse
 2012 - Randwick Racecourse
 2013 - Warwick Farm Racecourse
 2014 onwards - Randwick Racecourse

Winners

 2022 - Le Lude  
 2021 - Missybeel  
 2020 - Nettoyer  
 2019 - Nettoyer 
 2018 - Karavali
 2017 - Elle Lou
 2016 - Heavens Above
2015 - Adorabeel 
2014 - Diamond Drille 
2013 - Thy
2012 - Fibrillation
2011 - Warpath
2010 - Sacred Choice
2009 - Illuminates
2008 - Pravana
2007 - Banc De Fortune
2006 - Lord Of The Land

See also
 List of Australian Group races
 Group races

External links 
First three place getters Aspiration Quality  (ATC)

References

Horse races in Australia